Stephen Hoar (born May 28, 1982 in Oshawa, Ontario) is a Canadian lacrosse player formerly of the Toronto Rock in the National Lacrosse League and formerly of the Hamilton Nationals of Major League Lacrosse.

Professional career
Hoar played five seasons for the Rochester Knighthawks before being traded to the Rock in September 2008. In 2007, he became the all-time Knighthawks leader for face-off wins and is the only Knighthawk to have over 600 career face-off victories. On February 5, 2014, Hoar was released by the Rock. In 2016 he signed with The New England Black Wolves for a one year contract.

International career
Hoar won a gold medal with Team Canada at the 2006 World Field Lacrosse Championships in London, Ontario.

Statistics

NLL
Reference:

MLL

References

1982 births
Canadian lacrosse players
Lacrosse people from Ontario
Living people
Sportspeople from Oshawa
Rochester Knighthawks players
Hamilton Nationals players
Toronto Rock players